Vera's Backyard Bar-B-Que is a restaurant in Brownsville, Texas, United States. In 2020 it was named an America's Classic by the James Beard Foundation. According to Texas Monthly the restaurant was as of 2022 the only commercial entity in Texas serving barbacoa made with the traditional pit-smoking method.

History 
Alberto and Carmen Vera sold barbacoa from their home and opened the restaurant in 1955. Their son Armando Vera was born in 1960 and eventually took over. According to the James Beard Foundation, the methods they use date to the vaquero-cowboy culture of the area.

Production is a once-a-week process that culminates on weekends. Vera gathers ingredients on Wednesdays, does prep work Thursdays, starts cooking Fridays, and serves Saturdays and Sundays. The restaurant uses whole cow heads (minus the brain since 2005 because of concerns over mad cow) which are washed and wrapped in foil unseasoned. A brick-lined pit is heated with mesquite coals and the foil packets are stacked in it, 40 to 90 at a time, then buried while they roast for eight hours. Because of health codes Vera's as of 2022 is unique in serving barbacoa made using this traditional method commercially because they are grandfathered in; all other legal commercial providers steam the meat rather than pit-smoking it.

Menu 
The restaurant uses traditional methods to smoke barbacoa de cabeza, also called barbacoa de cabeza de res en pozo. The dish consists of a cow's head which is pit-smoked. Various parts such as the cheek, tongue, and eyes are sold separately as well as a pulled mixture of the remaining meats. The restaurant also offers other traditional offal dishes and brisket. Accompaniments consists of tortillas to make tacos and garnishes, and there are no side dishes. Local business is carryout; according to Cowboys and Indians only those from outside the area eat at the restaurant.

Recognition 
In 2020 the restaurant was named an America's Classic by the James Beard Foundation. When the Beard Foundation called to inform Vera of the award, he hung up on them twice, thinking they were trying to scam him; he stopped answering the phone and the foundation had to call Brownsville mayor Trey Mendez to contact Vera and convince him the award was legitimate and very prestigious.

References

Further reading 

 

1955 establishments in Texas
Barbecue restaurants in Texas
James Beard Foundation Award winners